The Best of Board Wargaming is a 1980 book edited by Nicholas Palmer and published by Hippocrene Books.

Contents
The Best of Board Wargaming is a sequel to the author's The Comprehensive Guide to Board Wargaming (1977).

Reception
Steve Jackson reviewed The Best of Board Wargaming in The Space Gamer No. 39. Jackson commented that "This one belongs in the library of the game club, collector, or serious designer. As a reference work for the average gamer, fantasy/SF or otherwise, I couldn't recommend it. Consumer Guide's Complete Book of Wargames [...] is bigger, better, and half the price."

References

1980 non-fiction books
Books by Nicholas Palmer
English-language books
Wargaming books